The men's 200 metres at the 2016 European Athletics Championships took place at the Olympic Stadium on 7 and 8 July.

Records

Schedule

Results

Round 1 

First 3 (Q) and next 5 fastest (q) qualify for the semifinals.

Wind:Heat 1: -1.1 m/s, Heat 2: -1.2 m/s, Heat 3: -0.1 m/s

Semifinals 

First 2 (Q) and next 2 fastest (q) qualify for the final.

Wind:Heat 1: -1.7 m/s, Heat 2: -0.1 m/s, Heat 3: -1.1 m/s

*Athletes who received a bye to the semifinals

Final 

Wind: -0.9 m/s

References

External links
 amsterdam2016.org, official championship site.

200 M
200 metres at the European Athletics Championships